Wings of Lebanon (Arabic: أجنحة لبنان) was a privately held Lebanese airline, which began operations in 2006.

History
In July 2016 the airline expanded its business model from pure operations to also include largely seasonal scheduled international passenger services from its  main base at Beirut Rafic Hariri International Airport. The carrier has historically operated one Boeing 737-300 (OD-HAJ), and has catered for seasonal peaks using a variety of wet-leased narrow body Airbus or Boeing aircraft. On 20 May 2018, Wings of Lebanon took delivery of their first Boeing 737-700 aircraft.

On 26 August 2020, Wings of Lebanon announced that they were to suspend operations, citing the COVID-19 pandemic and the economic situation in Lebanon as the reason for ending operations.

Destinations
Wings of Lebanon operated the following routes:

Georgia

Tbilisi - Tbilisi International Airport (seasonal)

Germany

Berlin - Berlin Schönefeld Airport

Greece

 Corfu - Corfu International Airport (seasonal)
 Mykonos - Mykonos Airport (seasonal)

Lebanon

 Beirut - Rafic Hariri International Airport (hub)

Sweden
 Stockholm - Stockholm Arlanda Airport (seasonal)

Turkey

 Antalya - Antalya Airport (seasonal)
 İzmir - İzmir Adnan Menderes Airport

Fleet

Prior to closure, The Wings of Lebanon fleet consisted of the following aircraft:

Former fleet
The historic fleet of Wings of Lebanon fleet is as follows:

 Boeing 737-300 (OD-HAJ) (Returned to lessor)

References

External links

Defunct airlines of Lebanon
Airlines established in 2006
Airlines disestablished in 2020
Airlines disestablished due to the COVID-19 pandemic